Vincent Aron Cate (born 1963) is a cryptography software developer based in Anguilla. He graduated from the University of California, Berkeley and ran an Atari hardware business in the 1980s before beginning a Ph.D. programme at Carnegie Mellon University, but dropped out and moved to Anguilla to pursue business opportunities there. In his new home, he would go on to establish an internet service provider, a computer club for young students, and an annual cryptography conference. A former U.S. citizen, he gave up his U.S. citizenship in 1998 in protest of U.S. laws on the export of cryptography.

Career
In the early 1980s, Cate lived in San Jose, California, where he ran a business producing software and hardware to interface CP/M-compatible printers, disk drives, and keyboards with Atari computers such as the Atari 400. This allowed CP/M system owners considering the purchase of an Atari computer to save on the cost of peripherals for their new computer. Cate graduated from the University of California, Berkeley and later enrolled as a doctoral student at Carnegie Mellon University, where he did research on file systems with Thomas Gross, and also worked on allowing remote file systems to be mounted over FTP. However, with the rise of the Internet, Cate lost interest in his research and left the university without completing his dissertation, receiving a master's degree.

In 1994, Cate moved to the British Overseas Territory of Anguilla to pursue business opportunities. He was attracted to Anguilla for several reasons, including the tropical climate, low taxes, and stable government compared to other Caribbean countries and territories. As he stated in an interview, "The country has many of the characteristics of a small town in the USA. Seems like everyone knows everyone ... [but] I could not imagine too many towns of 10,000 in the US having this much computer infrastructure."

At first, Cate attempted to start an electronic money business. However, in those early years, local banks were wary of Cate's business model, which involved accepting credit cards over the Internet, and so instead he started an internet service provider, offering dial-up Internet access to island residents. Eventually, Cate's company, Offshore Information Services, expanded from the ISP business to offer company formation services, aimed at helping clients operate e-commerce businesses in Anguilla. OIS' servers ran software from C2Net, one of the early supporters of Transport Layer Security, in order to allow clients to offer secure online transactions to their customers. OIS also sold cryptographic software aimed at end-users in the finance sector. One motivation of Cate's work was to provide a haven from increasing internet censorship in China, France, Germany, and the United States; he mentioned the U.S.' Communications Decency Act of 1996 as an issue of major concern to him. His work prompted comparisons to the Bruce Sterling novel Islands in the Net.

Other activities
Outside of his work in Anguilla, Cate also started a computer club which helped schools in Anguilla acquire donations of old computers for the use of their students; he described it as his "best source of talent searching", and by 1998 had hired three members of the computer club for his own business.

In 1997, Cate collaborated with cypherpunk Robert Hettinga and Massachusetts Institute of Technology researcher Rafael Hirschfield to organise the International Conference on Financial Cryptography. Presenters at the first conference included Ron Rivest. The conference was highly successful, though the list of famous presenters was not the sole contributing factor: presentations were all scheduled for the morning hours, allowing participants to enjoy the beaches in the afternoon.

Since the 1990s, Cate has also been involved with the administration of .ai, Anguilla's country code top-level domain.

Political views
Cate engaged in civil disobedience against U.S. cryptography policy by setting up a webpage inviting readers to "become an international arms trafficker in one click". The page contained an HTML form which, when submitted, would e-mail three lines of Perl code implementing the RSA public-key encryption algorithm to a server in Anguilla; this could have qualified as unlicensed export of munitions under U.S. law at the time. Visitors could opt to have their names and e-mail addresses displayed publicly in a list on that page. By 1997, the list contained the names or aliases of more than one thousand visitors; that number grew to nearly seven thousand by September 1998.

In September 1998 Cate took his protests a step further, paying $5,000 to naturalise as a citizen of Mozambique and then giving up his U.S. citizenship. (He would have had to wait for more than a decade longer to qualify for naturalisation as a British Overseas Territories citizen with Anguilla Belonger status.) Cate stated in that he was motivated by the desire "to be free from the silly U.S. laws on crypto", and that by giving up citizenship "[t]here's less chance of getting in any trouble with the U.S. government and there's also less chance of getting shot by a terrorist." In April 1999, a notice confirming his loss of U.S. citizenship was published in the Federal Register as required by the Health Insurance Portability and Accountability Act.

Publications

References

External links

1963 births
Living people
American emigrants to Anguilla
Carnegie Mellon University alumni
People from San Jose, California
People who renounced United States citizenship
University of California, Berkeley alumni
Naturalized citizens of Mozambique
Mozambican people of American descent
Anguillan scientists